A hymn metre (US: meter) indicates the number of syllables for the lines in each stanza of a hymn. This provides a means of marrying the hymn's text with an appropriate hymn tune for singing.

Hymn and poetic metre
In the English language poetic metres and hymn metres have different starting points but there is nevertheless much overlap. The hymn Amazing Grace is used as an example:
Amazing grace, how sweet the sound
that saved a wretch like me.
I once was lost, but now am found,
was blind, but now I see.
Analyzing this, a poet would see couplets with four iambic metrical feet in the first and third lines, and three in the second and fourth. A musician would more likely count eight syllables in the first line and six in the second. This would be described as 8.6.8.6 (or 86.86).  The words of Amazing Grace can therefore be set to any tune that has the 8.6.8.6 metre, for example The House of the Rising Sun.

Conventionally most hymns in this 86.86 pattern are iambic (weak-strong syllable pairs).  By contrast most hymns in an 87.87 pattern are trochaic, with strong-weak syllable pairs:
Love divine, all loves excelling,
joy of heav'n to earth come down,...

In practice many hymns conform to one of a relatively small number of metres (syllable patterns), and within the most commonly used ones there is a general convention as to whether its stress pattern is iambic or trochaic (or perhaps dactylic, such as Great Is Thy Faithfulness). It is rare to find any significant metrical substitution in a well-written hymn; indeed, such variation usually indicates a poorly constructed text.

Terminology and abbreviations
Most hymnals include a metrical index of the book's tunes. A hymn may be sung to any tune in the same meter, as long as the poetic foot (such as iambic, trochaic) also conforms.

All metres can be represented numerically, for example "Abide With Me" which is 10.10.10.10. Some of the most frequently encountered however are instead referred to by names:
C.M., or CM— Common metre, 8.6.8.6; a quatrain (four-line stanza) with alternating lines of iambic tetrameter and iambic trimeter, which rhymes in the second and fourth lines and sometimes in the first and third.
L.M., or LM— Long metre, 8.8.8.8; a quatrain in iambic tetrameter, which rhymes in the second and fourth lines and often in the first and third.
S.M., or SM— Short metre, 6.6.8.6; iambic lines in the first, second, and fourth are in trimeter, and the third in tetrameter, which rhymes in the second and fourth lines and sometimes in the first and third. "Blest Be the Tie that Binds" is an example of a hymn in short metre.

Two verses may be joined together and sung to a tune of double the length:
D.C.M. (also C.M.D., or CMD)—Doubled CM, 8.6.8.6.8.6.8.6.
D.L.M. (also L.M.D., or LMD)—Doubled LM, 8.8.8.8.8.8.8.8.
8.7.8.7.D—equivalent to two verses of 8.7.8.7., either trochaic or iambic.

A few hymns have an inconsistent metrical pattern across their verses; one well-known example is O Come, All Ye Faithful. Such a metre is described as '"irregular".

Local and historic variation
While the terminology above enjoys widespread agreement across the English-speaking world, there is some regional variation. Even within a region there may be historical variation and development. For example some metre names no longer widely used includes:
P.M. or PM— Peculiar metre; formerly used for irregular, rare, or one-of-a-kind metres in a hymnal.
 L.P.M. or LPM— Long Particular Meter, may refer to a six-line stanza of iambic tetrameter 8.8.8.8.8.8,
H.M., or HM— Hallelujah metre, may sometimes be used in reference to 66.66.88,
50th— 10.10.10.10.10.10
104th— 10.10.11.11
112th— 6.6.6.6.8.8
124th— 10.10.10.10.10
148th— 6.6.6.6.4.4.4.4
The latter metres are named for the metres of metrical psalms.

See also  
 Foot (prosody)
 Hymn tune
 Metre (poetry)
 Trochaic septenarius

Notes

References

External links
 "Hymn" in Encyclopædia Britannica Online.

Musical notation
Hymnology
European rhythm